Mount Pleiones is the southernmost and highest peak of The Pleiades, at the head of Mariner Glacier. Named by the New Zealand Antarctic Place-Names Committee (NZ-APC) after Pleiones of Greek mythology.

Volcanoes of Victoria Land
Pennell Coast
Stratovolcanoes

References